This article includes the ISSF World Shooting Championships medal tables of currently discontinued shooting events. The events that International Shooting Sport Federation presently includes in World Championships and Olympic Games are listed in ISSF shooting events article.

300 metres free rifle prone 40 shots, men 

This event was held at World Championships in 1897–1986.

300 metres free rifle prone 40 shots, men team

This event was held at World Championships in 1937–1986.

300 metre free rifle standing 40 shots, men 

This event was held at World Championships in 1897–1990.

300 metre free rifle standing 40 shots, men team

This event was held at World Championships in 1937–1990.

300 metre free rifle kneeling 40 shots, men 

This event was held at World Championships in 1897–1990.

300 metre free rifle kneeling 40 shots, men team

This event was held at World Championships in 1937–1990.

300 metre army rifle prone, men 

This event was held at World Championships in 1911–1939.

300 metre army rifle prone, men team

This event was held at World Championships in 1937.

300 metre army rifle standing, men 

This event was held at World Championships in 1911–1939.

300 metre army rifle standing, men team

This event was held at World Championships in 1937.

300 metre army rifle kneeling, men 

This event was held at World Championships in 1911–1939.

300 metre army rifle kneeling, men team

This event was held at World Championships in 1937.

300 metre army rifle 3X40 shots, men 

This event was held at World Championships in 1939.

300 metre army rifle 3X30 shots, men 

This event was held at World Championships in 1911.

300 metre army rifle 3X20 shots, men 

This event was held at World Championships in 1912–1939.

300 metre army rifle 3X20 shots, men team

This event was held at World Championships in 1935–1939.

300 metre army rifle 30 fast shots, men 

This event was held at World Championships in 1962.

300 metre army rifle URS-system, men 

This event was held at World Championships in 1958.

300 metre army rifle URS-system, men team

This event was held at World Championships in 1958.

300 metre army rifle ARG-system, men 

This event was held at World Championships in 1949.

300 metre army rifle ARG-system, men team

This event was held at World Championships in 1949.

300 metre army rifle 50 rapid fire shots, men 

This event was held at World Championships in 1947.

300 metre army rifle 50 rapid fire shots, men team 

This event was held at World Championships in 1947.

100 metre and 200 metre free rifle prone 60 shots, men 

This event was held at World Championships in 1931.

50 yards and 100 yards rifle prone 30+30 shots, men 

This event was held at World Championships in 1947–1958.

50 yards and 100 yards rifle prone 30+30 shots, men team 

This event was held at World Championships in 1947–1958.

50 metre free rifle prone 40 shots, men 

This event was held at World Championships in 1929–1970.

50 metre free rifle prone 40 shots, men team 

This event was held at World Championships in 1929–1958.

50 metre free rifle standing 40 shots, men 

This event was held at World Championships in 1929–1990.

50 metre free rifle standing 40 shots, men team 

This event was held at World Championships in 1929–1990.

50 metre free rifle kneeling 40 shots, men 

This event was held at World Championships in 1930–1990.

50 metre free rifle kneeling 40 shots, men team

This event was held at World Championships in 1930–1990.

50 metre standard rifle 3X20 shots, men 

This event was held at World Championships in 1966–1974.

50 metre standard rifle 3X20 shots, men team

This event was held at World Championships in 1966–1974.

100 metre running deer single shots, men 

This event was held at World Championships in 1929–1962.

100 metre running deer single shots, men team 

This event was held at World Championships in 1929–1962.

100 metre running deer double shots, men 

This event was held at World Championships in 1929–1962.

100 metre running deer double shots, men team

This event was held at World Championships in 1929–1962.

100 metre running deer single shots and double shots, men 

This event was held at World Championships in 1949.

100 metre running deer single shots and double shots, men team

This event was held at World Championships in 1949.

50 yards and 100 yards rifle prone 30+30 shots, women 

This event was held at World Championships in 1958.

50 metre free rifle 3X30 shots, women 

This event was held at World Championships in 1958–1962.

50 metre free rifle 3X30 shots, women team 

This event was held at World Championships in 1958.

50 metre free rifle prone, women 

This event was held at World Championships in 1962.

25 metre standard pistol, women 

This event was held at World Championships in 1970.

See also
 List of Olympic medalists in shooting
 ISSF Olympic skeet
 ISSF Olympic trap
 List of medalists at the European Shooting Championships
 List of medalists at the European Shotgun Championships

References

External links
 
 ISSF official website
 WCH medallists, discontinued events (ISSF website)

Shooting